This is a list of commercial banks in Benin
 FEMA BANK
 FEMA BANK BENIN
 African Investment Bank
 International Commercial Bank I.C.B. Benin
 Benin Regional Solidarity Bank
 Banque Atlantique Bénin
 Bank of Africa Bénin
 BGFIBank Benin
 Banque de l'Habitat du Bénin
 Banque Internationale du Bénin
 Banque Sahélo-Saharienne pour l'Investissement et le Commerce (BSSIC)
 Continental Bank Bénin
 GM Clearing House EU
 Caissie Primes
 MSF BANK
 MSF Bank Benin
 King Bank Plc Bénin
 Diamond Bank Bénin
 Ecobank Bénin
 GASSOU DIASPORA BANK
 GASSOU DIASPORA BANKING
 GASSOU DIASPORA BANK BENIN
 Industrial Bank of Benin, West Africa
 Livex International Bank Bénin
 O.P.C
 United Benin Bank
 Allied Benin Financial Institution
 Ulti Bank Plc Bénin
 Financial Bank Bénin
 Societe Generale de Banques au Bénin
 United Bank for Africa
 ICASH POWER Financial & Mortgage bank

See also

Central Bank of West African States, (Regional Central Bank Serving Benin)
Banque Capitale Du Benin
List of banks in Africa

References

 
Banks
Benin
Benin